The Guadeloupe parakeet (Psittacara labati) is a hypothetical species of parrot that would have been endemic to Guadeloupe.

Description
Jean-Baptiste Labat described a population of small parrots living on Guadeloupe:

Taxonomy
They were later named Conurus labati, and are now called the Guadeloupe parakeet. It has been postulated to be a separate species based on little evidence. There are no specimens or remains of the extinct parrots. Their taxonomy may never be fully elucidated, and so their postulated status as a separate species is hypothetical. It is presumed to have gone extinct in the late 18th century, if it did indeed exist.

References

Aratinga
Birds described in 1905
Bird extinctions since 1500
Taxa named by Walter Rothschild
Controversial parrot taxa
Extinct birds of the Caribbean
Taxonomy articles created by Polbot
Hypothetical extinct species